Phil Sykes may refer to:

 Phil Sykes (field hockey) (born 1970), American field hockey player
 Phil Sykes (ice hockey) (born 1959), Canadian ice hockey player